Thomas Forster was an English politician and landowner.

Thomas Forster may also refer to:

Politics
Thomas Forster (MP for Liskeard), in 1399, Member of Parliament for Liskeard
Thomas Forster (MP for Lincoln) (1406–1415), Member of Parliament for Lincoln
Thomas Forster (of Adderstone) (1659–1725) Member of Parliament for Northumberland for 1705–1708 and High Sheriff of Northumberland in 1703

Science & mathematics
Thomas Furly Forster (1761–1825), English botanist
Thomas Ignatius Maria Forster (1789–1860), English astronomer and naturalist
Thomas Emerson Forster (1802–1875), English mining engineer
Thomas Forster (mathematician) (born 1948), British set theorist and philosopher

Others
Thomas Forster (painter) (1676/7–after 1712), English portraitist 
Tom Forster (baseball) (1859–1946), baseball player
Tommy Forster (1894–1955), English footballer
Tom Forster (coach), American gymnastics coach
Thomas Forster (dancer) (born 1980s), English ballet dancer

See also

Thomas Foster (disambiguation)